The 2017 FIA Formula One Esports Series was the inaugural season of the Formula One Esports Series. It started on September 4, 2017, and ended on November 25, 2017. It was held on Formula One's official 2017 game.

Qualification
Qualification was held over two stages. These stages were:
Stage One: Players were required to score a podium finish in a Force India VJM10 at Monza, starting in 6th position with 5 laps remaining. It is a points based event, with players awarded a score based on skill, speed and difficulty/assist settings. Players also earned points to their score by driving cleanly. This challenge was available from 4–12 September 2017.
Stage Two: Players were required to win a race in a Red Bull RB13 at Suzuka, starting in 5th position with 5 laps remaining. Players scored points in the same manner as in the first stage. This challenge was available from 18 to 26 September 2017.
A total of 63,827 drivers took part in the qualifying stages, with 40 progressing to the semi-finals. 10 came from each of the platforms (Xbox One, PlayStation 4 and PC), 9 came from F1 affiliated leagues, and 1 was a specially-selected wildcard.

Semi-final
The semi-final was held at the Gfinity Arena in London, the United Kingdom on 10 October 2017. Drivers were split into 4 groups of 10, and competed in two heat races - one at the Silverstone Circuit and the other at the Autódromo José Carlos Pace. The top 5 drivers on points in each heat after these two races progressed to the final.

Results
Heat 1

Heat 2

Heat 3

Heat 4

Final
The final was held as a support category to the 2017 Abu Dhabi Grand Prix, over 24–25 November 2017. Races were held at the Circuit Gilles Villeneuve, Circuit de Spa-Francorchamps and Yas Marina Circuit. Drivers scored points in the same structure as the regular Formula One season for the first two races, and scored points in a 45-38-34-29-24-20-18-16-14-12-10-9-8-7-6-5-4-3-2-1 structure in the third.

Results

References

External links 
 

Formula One Esports Series
 
Formula One